Wolfgang Kaniber (22 November 1939 – 9 April 2021) was a German footballer who played as a striker.

References

 Profile
 
 

1939 births
2021 deaths
German footballers
Association football forwards
Ligue 1 players
Fortuna Düsseldorf players
VfL Osnabrück players
RC Strasbourg Alsace players
West German expatriate footballers
West German expatriate sportspeople in France
Expatriate footballers in France
Sportspeople from Würzburg
Footballers from Bavaria
West German footballers